Suavodrillia declivis is a species of sea snail, a marine gastropod mollusk in the family Borsoniidae.

Description
The shell is multicarinate with a few, strong carinae. The siphonal canal is somewhat more produced and narrowed. The anal sinus is shallow. The columella is not plicate. The color of the shell is light reddish fulvous.

Distribution
This species occurs in the Pacific Ocean off Japan.

References

 Tucker, J.K. 2004 Catalog of recent and fossil turrids (Mollusca: Gastropoda). Zootaxa 682:1–1295.

 declivis
Gastropods described in 1880